CCGS Kelso is a scientific research vessel operated by the Canadian Coast Guard from CGS Base Burlington in the Central and Arctic Region of Canada.
She was commissioned on September 8, 2009, by Terence Young, Member of Parliament for Oakville, at the Canadian Centre of Inland Waters in Burlington. The vessel was built by ABCO Industries Lunenburg Shipyard to replace the retiring CCGS Shark. The ship is named for the late Dr John Kelso,  a noted scientist with the Department of Fisheries and Oceans, the parent department for the Coast Guard.

She is classed as a "Near Shore Fisheries Research Vessel" and intended for use in running trawls, box core sampling, bottom sampling and sampling for water quality analysis.
She can seat ten passengers, in addition to her crew of three.
She replaced .

See also

References

Ships of the Canadian Coast Guard
Ships built in Nova Scotia
2009 ships